Raja Muhammad Zafar-ul-Haq (born 18 November 1935), is an ex-Pakistan Senator from the Punjab, served from being elected on 12 March 2009. He had been the  leader of the opposition in Senate from 2018 to 2021. He is serving as the Chairman of the Pakistan Muslim League (N), a centre-right party, since 20 February 2000.

A retired diplomat and lawyer by profession, Zafar-ul-Haq served as the Minister of Religious Affairs in second administration of Prime Minister Nawaz Sharif from 1997 until being removed in 1999. Haq is known for his views for support of the religious conservatism but strongly advocated for religious temperance and humility.

In addition, he is also known for leading the constitutional initiatives to form the inquiry commission on the Kargil War, against Pervez Musharraf, whom he saw as a "traitor", and voiced support for civilian control of the military.

Biography

Early life and career in law

Zafar-ul-Haq was born in a small village, Matore, located in Kahuta Tehsil, Punjab in India into a Janjua family on 18 November 1935. His father, Raja Fazal Dad Khan, was a Deputy Superintendent of Police in the Punjab Police Department and attended various high schools in Punjab, and matriculated from Sialkot in 1952.

He went to attend the Government College University in Lahore where he secured his graduate with B.A. in Philosophy in 1956. He went to attend the law school of the Punjab University to read law and the political science, graduating with the LLB degree in civil law, and the MSc in political science in 1958.

He started practicing law with the law firm, the S.M. Zafar associates, in Lahore, but later moved to Rawalpindi where he took cases and practiced law until 1981. Zafar-ul-Haq moved to Islamabad where he became member of the Supreme Court Bar Association and became the supreme court advocate from 1985 until 1987. In 1977, he was elected as the president of the Rawalpindi Bar Association and was serving as vice president of the Punjab Bar Council in 1981.

Political career

Political Career Summarized
• Raja Muhammad Zafar-ul-Haq formally joined Pakistan Muslim League after his graduation in 1956 and has remained loyal with this political party for more than fifty years.

• He was elected as the General Secretary of Pakistan Muslim League in District Rawalpindi from 1963 to 1971.

• He was elected as the President of Pakistan Muslim League, District Rawalpindi in 1971 and continued till 1981.

• Haq was elected as President Rawalpindi Bar Association 1977–78 and was elected as the Vice President High Court Bar for 1981–1982.
• He was given a place in the Panel of experts for Pakistan Law Commission.

• Haq served as the Minister for Information & Broadcasting and Minister for Religious Affairs 1981–85 as nominee of Pakistan Muslim League Leadership.

• He served as the Chairman of National Committee for Social Reforms and submitted a full detailed report which was widely appreciated.

• He was the Head of a Committee to reform Pakistan Penal Code and Evidence Act. These Laws were amended accordingly.
• Raja Zafar-ul-Haq served as the Ambassador of Pakistan to Egypt 1985–86.

• Served as the Political Adviser to the Prime Minister of Pakistan with the status of a Federal Minister from 1986–87.

• He represented Pakistan in the United Nations General Assembly in the 45th Session in 1990–91.

• He was elected as a Member of Pakistan Senate in 1991 for a term of six years, where he served until 1997.

• Elected Chairman Standing Committee on Law and Religious Affairs of the Senate 1991–94.

• He served as Chairman Pakistan Economy Commission and submitted detailed reports.

• He served as head of the commission to eradicate Riba and submitted a final report.

• He was elected as Central Vice President of Pakistan Muslim League (N) in 1996.

• Appointed Member, Board of Trustees, Islamic International University Islamabad in 1992–97.

• He was elected as the Secretary General, Motamar Al-Alam Al-Islam (World Muslim Congress) in 1992. The oldest International Organization of Muslims, established in 1926 which is a Class-I Consultative Status Observed with the UN and its allied bodies and Observer status with the OIC.

• Elected Leader of the Opposition, Senate of Pakistan from May 1994 – 1996.

• Elected Leader of the House, Senate of Pakistan in 1997–99

• Served as the Federal Minister for Religious Affairs in July 1997 – October, 1999
• He was re-elected as Secretary General, Motamar Al Alam Al-Islami in 1997–2002.

• Elected Chairman, Pakistan Muslim League (N) 2000–2009. Re-elected in 2011, where he serves till date.

• Elected Secretary General, Motamar Al-Alam Al-Islami in December 2002 for another five years term
• Re-elected Secretary General of Motamar 2007–2012.

• Elected Member of the Senate 2009–2015 term.

• Elected Leader of the (Six Parties) Independent Opposition Group 2009, in the Senate of Pakistan and was appointed as the Leader of the PML (N) Parliamentary Party in the Senate.

• Elected as Chairman Senate Standing Committee on Industries and Production in 2012.

• Appointed as Leader of the House, Senate of Pakistan on 10 June 2013.

• Appointed as Leader of the House in Senate of Pakistan on 12 March 2015.

• He was re-elected Secretary General of Motamar Al-Alam Al-Islami 2015 for five years term.

• Re-elected Chairman, Pakistan Muslim League (N) on 18 October 2016, where he serves till date.

• He was eclared as Leader of the Opposition, Senate of Pakistan on 24 August 2018 representing the largest party in Senate with 30 Senators.

Ambassadorship to Egypt and Religious minister in Sharif administrations

Since 1963, Zafar-ul-Haq had been participating in the national politics on a Pakistan Muslim League (PML) and is known for reflected views on religious conservatism while stressing to adopt the Humility to prevent violence and insanity. From 1980–81, Zafar-ul-Haq served as a member on the Panel of Experts for Pakistan Law Commission under the Ministry of Law and Justice. In 1981, he joined the Zia administration as the Information Minister and the Minister of Religious Affairs which served until 1985.

In 1985, President Zia-ul-Haq appointed him as the Pakistan Ambassador to Egypt which he tenured until 1986 when he was appointed as an adviser to Zia administration. He advised Prime Minister Mohammad Junejo on political and legal matters until 1987, and sided to join the Pakistan Muslim League (N) led by its President Fida Mohammad. In 1990–91, Zafar-ul-Haq presented Pakistan in the International Law Commission of the United Nations and was elected as Pakistan Senator for the first time in 1991 for a six-year term. In 1992, he was appointed in the Board of Trustees (BoT) of International Islamic University in Islamabad until 1997. During this time, he was appointed as the Secretary-General of the World Muslim Congress until 1997.

In 1997, he participated in the nationwide general elections on a Rawalpindi constituency which he successfully defended, and joined the second administration of Prime Minister Nawaz Sharif as the Minister of Religious Affairs. He played a crucial and vital role in drafting the Fifteenth Amendment to the Constitution of Pakistan to declare the "Islam as the Supreme Law"— the amendment was passed with the two-thirds majority in the National Assembly (lower house) but failed to be passed in the Senate (Upper house) in 1999.

Over the Kargil conflict in 1999, he reportedly warned the BJP ministry in India of "Pakistan resorting to the nuclear weapons issue if the country's territorial integrity, security and sovereignty is harmed. Though, his statement was not taken as serious as he was not involved in the national security matters at that time, and was seen as a political statement which he stated during the meeting with his constituents.

In 2000, Zafar-ul-Haq was elected as the Chairman of the Pakistan Muslim League (N), which he is currently serving, whilst Javed Hashmi becoming the President of Pakistan Muslim League (N).

On 4 December 2001, Zafar-ul-Haq appealed to the religious and conservative mass to call for the massive public demonstration against the Pervez Musharraf, leading the pro-democracy movement with Amin Fahim to restore the civilian control. In 2009 he was elected to the Pakistani Senate for a six-year term. He was elected as the leader of the Independent Opposition Group (consisting of more than 6 parliamentary parties) in the Senate of Pakistan in 2009.

On 15 February 2018, PML(N) announced to appoint Zafar-ul-Haq for the Chairman Senate for the senate elections that were scheduled in 12 March 2018. Despite the PML(N) successfully retained the majority in the Senate, Zafar-ul-Haq's bid for the chairmanship was fell short through the number countings and, was defeated by independent Sadiq Sanjrani, who had support from the Asif Zardari and Imran Khan in spite of their disagreement.

Upon hearing the news of the number manipulation in the Senate elections, PML(N)'s leadership and the Prime Minister Shahid Abbasi reacted very negatively, and reportedly quoted in the news media that "Sanjrani holds no respect", and calls were made for the reelection of the Senate elections.

On 24 August 2018, he was appointed leader of the opposition in the Senate.

Political positions and views

His views reflected the religious conservatism but has strongly voice for the religious sanity and the interfaith dialogue among the three Abrahamic religions– Judaism, Christianity, and Islam. In his public speaking at the conservative conventions in the country, Zafar-ul-Haq has strongly stressed and argued for the religious temperance.

In 2005, Zafar-ul-Haq demanded the inquiry commission on kargil debacle to be investigated by the Supreme Court of Pakistan to point and recommend the punishment for those involved.

After his removal from the Minister of Religious Affairs in 1999 due to the military takeover in 1999, Zafar-ul-Haq viewed very negatively of the performance of the Musharraf administration, which he believed was working towards weakening the state on a deliberate international agenda. In an interview in 2012, Zafar-ul-Haq held President Musharraf responsible of promoting religious intolerance in the country by introducing legislative reforms reflecting against the teachings of Islam without the consent of the public. He also accused Musharraf of starting the starting the armed conflict to harm the Kashmir cause, and raised his voice for civilian control of the military. Though, he has repeatedly spoken very highly of Nawaz Sharif's services done to the country and Islam, he remained unsympathetic to suicide attacks taking place on Pervez Musharraf.

In 2011, he was quoted as saying that Islam is the prime source behind the uprising movements in the Middle East and North Africa. His statement came in response to the European intervention in Libya in favor of the Libyan Opposition.

See also

Democratic movements in Pakistan
Civilian control of the military
Civil-military relations
Khakistocracy
 Movement to impeach Pervez Musharraf
General Musharraf vs. Federation of Pakistan, et.al. 
Post Cold War era
Conservatism in Pakistan
Islam in Pakistan
Christianity in Pakistan 
Islam and Christianity
Interfaith dialogue

References

External links 
 
 UK website

|-

|-

|-

1935 births
Punjabi people
People from Rawalpindi District
Government College University, Lahore alumni
Punjab University Law College alumni
Pakistani lawyers
University of the Punjab alumni
Conservatism in Pakistan
Information Ministers of Pakistan
Pakistan Muslim League (N) politicians
Ambassadors of Pakistan to Egypt
Pakistani senators (14th Parliament)
Pakistani expatriates in Saudi Arabia
Religious Ministers of Pakistan
Pakistani democracy activists
Leaders of the House for the Senate of Pakistan
Members of the Pakistan Philosophical Congress
Living people

hi:पाकिस्तान मुस्लिम लीग
id:Liga Muslim Pakistan (N)
nl:Pakistan Muslim League (N)
pt:Liga Muçulmana do Paquistão-N
sv:Pakistanska muslimska förbundet - N
zh:巴基斯坦穆斯林联盟（谢里夫派）